Lily Gao is a Chinese-born Canadian actress who had major roles in the TV shows The Expanse and Second Jen, and the film Resident Evil: Welcome to Raccoon City.

Filmography

References

External links 

 

Year of birth missing (living people)
Living people
Canadian film actresses
Canadian television actresses